The New York City Fire Department in the United States, like most fire departments around the world, is organized in a paramilitary fashion. Its organizational structure includes regional commands for various geographic areas within its jurisdiction, operational commands for units of different functions, and administrative units and offices for various administrative functions.

Beneath that hierarchy are the individual units and uniformed personnel which carry out the missions and responsibilities of the fire department, which includes the primary role of emergency response and firefighting, as well as a range of other roles and duties.

Personnel

Executive Staff

The Department's executive staff is divided into two areas including a civilian fire commissioner who is in charge of the Department and a Fire Chief who is the operational lead. The current Fire Commissioner is Laura Kavanagh  and the current Chief of Department is John J. Hodgens . The 28-member executive staff includes the civilian deputy commissioners who are responsible for administrative bureaus within the Department, along with the Chief of Department, Chief of Fire Operations, Chief of EMS, Chief Fire Marshal, Chief of Training and other staff chiefs. Staff chiefs include the seven citywide tour commanders, the Chief of Fire Prevention, and the Chief of Safety.

Fire Operations

Under the Chief of Department, there are three Assistant Chiefs and two Deputy Assistant Chiefs who serve as Borough Commanders. Each Borough Commander is responsible for one of the five boroughs within New York City. Each Borough Commander commands the Deputy Division Chiefs and Battalion Chiefs within their respective boroughs.

Each borough is divided into 1-3 Divisions, and within each division 3-7 Battalions operate. Each Division is responsible for all of or a geographical section of a borough. Each Battalion is responsible for a geographical section of each Division. Each Battalion is further divided into individual firehouses that serve specific neighborhoods within each Battalion. Each Division is commanded by a Deputy Division Chief and each Battalion is commanded by a Battalion Chief.

Each firehouse contains 1-3 fire companies. There are six different types of fire companies that operate six different types of fire apparatus, or "rigs". Each company serves a different and unique purpose at fires or other emergencies. The six fire company types are Engine Companies, Ladder (or Truck) Companies, Squad Companies, Rescue Companies, Haz-Mat (Hazardous Materials) Company, and Marine Companies.

Each individual fire company is commanded by a Captain and three Lieutenants. The Captain is in charge of that company's firehouse. In a firehouse that contains more than one fire company, the Captain assigned to the engine company is in charge of the firehouse. When a Captain is not on-duty, one of the three company Lieutenants commands the unit. Each company, depending on the specific unit have the following assignments: There are 4 firefighters on Engine Companies with the fifth man or woman being the on-duty officer. Ladder Companies, Squad Companies, and the Rescue Companies staff the units with 5 firefighters on each tour or shift, excluding the on-duty officer. During each tour, each firefighter is assigned a specific "riding position" on the company's apparatus that designates what task each member is to perform at the scene of a fire or other emergency situations.

Apparatus Profile
217 City-Wide Firehouses 
3 Marine Stations

Frontline Fire Companies
197 Engine Companies (Including 6 High-Pressure Engines)
143 Ladder (Truck) Companies 
69 Rear-Mount Aerial Ladder Trucks
61 Mid-Mount Platform Ladder Trucks
13 Tractor-Drawn Aerial Ladder "Tiller" Trucks
5 Rescue Companies
8 Squad Companies
1 Hazardous Materials Company
3 Marine Companies

Command Units and Chiefs
1 Commissioner
1 First Deputy Commissioner
5 Deputy Commissioners
12 Assistant Commissioners
1 Chief of Department
8 Chiefs
14 Assistant Chiefs
10 Deputy Assistant Chiefs
14 Division Chiefs
53 Battalion Chiefs

Special and Support Units
3 Decontamination (Decon.) Units
3 Marine Rescue Boats
3 Marine Support Boats
3 Marine EMS Boats
6 Satellite Units
5 Collapse Rescue Units)
6 Recuperation and Care (RAC) Units
5 Mask Services Units
2 Tactical Support Units
2 High-Rise Units
1 Foam Tender Unit
5 Foam Units
6 Purple K Units
5 Fire Hydrant Thawing Units
2 Fuel Response Units
2 Highway Response Units
1 FDR Drive Response Unit
10 Brush Fire Units
2 Field Communications Units
2 Mobile Command Center Units
1 Mobile Operations Center
2 Command Tactical Units
13 Fire Family Transport Units
12 HMTU 2nd Pieces
23 Rapid Response Units (Respond with Chemical Protective Clothing-CPC Ladder Companies)
25 Rapid Response Units (Respond with SOC Support Ladder-SSL Companies)
1 SOC SCUBA Support Unit
1 SOC De-watering/Salvage Unit
1 SOC Logistics Support Unit
2 SOC Rebreather Units
1 SOC Rebreather Support Unit
1 SOC Air Compressor Unit
6 SOC Air Compressor Trailers
6 SOC Lighting Trailers
6 SOC Flood Water Response Units
6 SOC Low Water RHIBs (2 per trailer)
1 SOC Haz-Mat. Mass Decontamination Unit
10 SOC Collapse Rescue POD Units (2 units each per borough)
2 SOC Debris Clearing PODS
2 SOC Skid Steer PODS
2 SOC Skid Steers (1 John Deere & 1 Gehlig)
1 SOC Utility Support Unit
1 SOC Conveyor PODs
1 SOC Back hoe
1 SOC Hazmat Decon Unit
2 SOC Rescue Support Units
2 SOC Battery Operated Rail Carts in PODs
1 SOC Haz-Mat. Callback/CBRNE. Battalion Chief's Unit
3 SOC Auxiliary Water System Units

Reserve Units
Below is a list of the FDNY's ready reserve apparatus fleet:
21 Reserve Engines
10 Reserve Ladder Trucks
1 Reserve Rescue
2 Reserve Squads
1 Reserve Haz-Mat. Unit
1 Reserve Haz-Mat. Support Unit

EMS Units
39 Haz-Tac. Ambulances
11 Paramedic Rescue Ambulances
3 EMS Major Emergency Response Vehicles (MERVs)
3 EMS Logistics Support Units (LSUs)
3 EMS Mobile Respiratory Treatment Units (MRTUs)
4 Marine EMS Rescue Boats
3 Medical Evacuation Transport Units (METUs)

Manhattan Borough Command
Below are a list of the four divisions under the Manhattan Borough Command:
1st Division - 251 Lafayette St., Manhattan (Quarters of Ladder 20) - Serves Downtown and Lower Manhattan
1st Battalion - 100 Duane St., Manhattan (Quarters of Engine 7, Tower Ladder 1) - Serves the Financial District, Civic Center, Tribeca, and the World Trade Center.
2nd Battalion- 227 6th Ave., Manhattan (Quarters of Engine 24, Ladder 5) - Serves West Village, Greenwich Village, Little Italy, Tribeca, and SoHo.
4th Battalion - 25 Pitt St., Manhattan (Quarters of Engine 15, Tower Ladder 18) - Serves Chinatown, the Lower East Side, and Alphabet City.
6th Battalion - 108 E. 13th St., Manhattan (Quarters of Ladder 3) - Serves Gramercy Park, the Flatiron District, the Bowery, and Union Square.
7th Battalion - 146 W. 19th St., Manhattan (Quarters of Engine 3, Tower Ladder 12) - Serves Herald Square, Chelsea, the Garment District, and Hell's Kitchen.
3rd Division - 205 W. 77th St., Manhattan (Quarters of Ladder 25) - Serves Midtown, Uptown, and Harlem.
8th Battalion - 165 E. 51st St., Manhattan (Quarters of Engine 8, Ladder 2) - Serves Turtle Bay, Kips Bay, Murray Hill, and Times Square.
9th Battalion - 782 8th Ave., Manhattan (Quarters of Engine 54, Ladder 4) - Serves Columbus Circle, Lincoln Square, the Theater District, and Hell's Kitchen.
10th Battalion - 159 E. 85th St., Manhattan (Quarters of Engine 22, Tower Ladder 13) - Serves Yorkville, Lenox Hill, and the Upper East Side.
11th Battalion - 145 W. 100th St., Manhattan (Quarters of Engine 76, Tower Ladder 22) - Serves the Upper West Side and Morningside Heights.
12th Battalion - 2282 3rd Ave., Manhattan (Quarters of Engine 35, Tower Ladder 14) - Serves East Harlem, Harlem, and Spanish Harlem.
6th Division - 720 Melrose Ave., Bronx (Quarters of Engine 71, Ladder 55) - Serves the South Bronx, the West Bronx, and Harlem.
16th Battalion - 248 W. 143rd St., Manhattan (Quarters of Engine 69, Ladder 28) - Serves Harlem and Vinegar Hill.
7th Division - 2417 Webster Ave., Bronx (Quarters of Engine 48, Ladder 56) - Serves the North Bronx, the East Bronx, and Upper Manhattan.
13th Battalion - 515 W. 181st St., Manhattan (Quarters of Engine 93, Tower Ladder 45) - Serves Washington Heights, Hamilton Heights, Hudson Heights, and Inwood.

Division 6 and Division 7 are under the shared command of both the Manhattan and Bronx Borough Commanders, as both Divisions respond together to Manhattan as well as the Bronx.

The headquarters of the Manhattan Borough Commander is located in the 1st Battalion of the 1st Division, at 100 Duane St., Manhattan (Quarters of Engine 7, Tower Ladder 1, Battalion 1).

The following companies and units are under the Manhattan Borough Command, quartered in 47 Firehouses:

(*) Denotes a Decon. Engine Company.
(**) Denotes a SOC Support Ladder Company.
(***) Denotes a Chemical Protective Clothing (CPC) Ladder Company.

Bronx Borough Command
Below are a list of the 2 Divisions under the Bronx Borough Command:
6th Division - 720 Melrose Ave., Bronx (Quarters of Engine 71, Ladder 55) - Serves the South Bronx, the West Bronx, and Harlem.
3rd Battalion - 1226 Seneca Ave., Bronx (Quarters of Engine 94, Ladder 48) - Serves Castle Hill, Hunts Point, and Soundview.
14th Battalion - 341 E. 143rd St., Bronx (Quarters of Engine 60, Tower Ladder 17) - Serves the South Bronx, Mott Haven, Melrose, and Port Morris.
17th Battalion - 1259 Morris Ave., Bronx (Quarters of Engine 92, Tower Ladder 44) - Serves Tremont, Highbridge, Fleetwood, and Claremont.
26th Battalion - 1155 Washington Ave., Bronx (Quarters of Engine 50, Ladder 19) - Serves Morrisania, the South Bronx, and Foxhurst.
7th Division - 2417 Webster Ave., Bronx (Quarters of Engine 48, Ladder 56) - Serves the North Bronx, the East Bronx, and Upper Manhattan.
15th Battalion - 755 E. 233rd St., Bronx (Quarters of Engine 63, Ladder 39) - Serves Williamsbridge, Wakefield, Co-Op City, and Pelham Gardens.
18th Battalion - 925 E. Tremont Ave., Bronx (Quarters of Engine 45, Tower Ladder 58) - Serves West Farms, Fordham, and Belmont.
19th Battalion - 2175 Walton Ave., Bronx (Quarters of Engine 75, Tower Ladder 33) - Serves Mount Hope, Morris Heights, Fordham Heights, and Kingsbridge.
20th Battalion - 1518 Williamsbridge Rd., Bronx (Quarters of Squad 61) - Serves Morris Park, City Island, Throggs Neck, Schuylerville, and Van Nest.
27th Battalion - 2928 Briggs Ave., Bronx (Quarters of Engine 79, Ladder 37) - Serves Riverdale, Gun Hill, Bedford Park and Norwood.

Division 6 and Division 7 are under the shared command of both the Manhattan and Bronx Borough Commanders, as both Divisions respond into Northern Manhattan as well as the Bronx.

The headquarters of the Bronx Borough Commander is located in the 20th Battalion of the 7th Division at 3929 E. Tremont Ave., Bronx (Quarters of Engine 72).

The following companies and units are under the Bronx Borough Command, quartered in 33 Firehouses:

(*) Denotes a Decon. Engine Company.
(**) Denotes an SOC Support Ladder Company.
(***) Denotes a Chemical Protective Clothing (CPC) Ladder Company.

Staten Island Borough Command
Below are a list of companies under the command of the 8th Division under the Staten Island Borough Command:
8th Division - 1850 Clove Rd., Staten Island (Quarters of Engine 160, Rescue 5) - Serves Staten Island and Southern Brooklyn.
21st Battalion - 256 Hylan Blvd., Staten Island (Quarters of Engine 152)
22nd Battalion - 1189 Castleton Ave., Staten Island (Quarters of Tower Ladder 79)
23rd Battalion - 256 Nelson Ave., Staten Island (Quarters of Engine 162, Ladder 82)

Division 8 is under the shared command of both the Staten Island and Brooklyn Borough Commanders, as Division 8 responds to portions of Southern Brooklyn as well as Staten Island.

The headquarters of the Staten Island Borough Commander is located in the 8th Division, 21st Battalion at 3730 Victory Blvd., Staten Island (Quarters of Squad 8).

The following companies and units are under the Staten Island Borough Command, quartered in 19 Firehouses:

(*) Denotes a Decon. Engine Company.
(**) Denotes an SOC Support Ladder Company.
(***) Denotes a Chemical Protective Clothing (CPC) Ladder Company.

Brooklyn Borough Command
Below are a list of the 3 Divisions under the Brooklyn Borough Command:
8th Division - 1850 Clove Rd., Staten Island (Quarters of Engine 160, Rescue 5) - Serves Staten Island and Southern Brooklyn
Battalion 40 - 5117 4th Ave., Brooklyn (Quarters of Engine 201, Tower Ladder 114) - Serves Sunset Park, Bay Ridge, and Borough Park.
Battalion 42 - 8653 18th Ave., Brooklyn (Quarters of Engine 243, Ladder 168) - Serves Bay Ridge, Bath Beach, Dyker Heights, and Bensonhurst.
Battalion 43 - 2929 W. 8th St., Brooklyn (Quarters of Engine 245, Tower Ladder 161) - Serves Coney Island, Brighton Beach, and Bensonhurst.
11th Division - 172 Tillary St., Brooklyn (Quarters of Engine 207, Ladder 110, Battalion 31) - Serves Western and Northern Brooklyn
Battalion 28 - 392 Himrod St., Brooklyn (Quarters of Engine 271, Tower Ladder 124) - Serves Bushwick, East Williamsburg, and Greenpoint.
Battalion 31 - 172 Tillary St., Brooklyn (Quarters of Engine 207, Ladder 110, Division 11) - Serves Fort Greene, Brooklyn Navy Yard, Williamsburg, and Boerum Hill.
Battalion 32 - 31 Richards St., Brooklyn (Quarters of Engine 202, Ladder 101) - Serves Red Hook, Brooklyn Heights, and Cobble Hill.
Battalion 35 - 187 Union Ave., Brooklyn (Quarters of Engine 216, Ladder 108) - Serves Williamsburg.
Battalion 48 - 1307 Prospect Ave., Brooklyn (Quarters of Engine 240) - Serves Park Slope, Gowanus, Greenwood, and Borough Park.
Battalion 57 - 206 Monroe St., Brooklyn (Quarters of Engine 235) - Serves Bed-Stuy and Prospect Heights.
15th Division - 885 Howard Ave., Brooklyn (Quarters of Engine 283) - Serves Western and Southern Brooklyn
Battalion 33 - 1635 E. 14th St., Brooklyn (Quarters of Engine 276, Ladder 156) - Serves Gravesend, Midwood, Flatlands, and Marine Park.
Battalion 37 - 32 Ralph Ave., Brooklyn (Quarters of Engine 222) - Serves Bed-Stuy and Bushwick.
Battalion 38 - 1352 St. Johns Pl., Brooklyn (Quarters of Engine 234, Ladder 123) - Serves Crown Heights, Prospect Lefferts Gardens, and Prospect Heights.
Battalion 39 - 799 Lincoln Ave., Brooklyn (Quarters of Engine 225, Tower Ladder 107) - Serves East New York.
Battalion 41 - 2900 Snyder Ave., Brooklyn (Quarters of Engine 248) - Serves Flatbush and Borough Park.
Battalion 44 - 107 Watkins St., Brooklyn (Quarters of Engine 231, Tower Ladder 120) - Serves Brownsville, Bed-Stuy, Crown Heights, and East New York.
Battalion 58 - 1361 Rockaway Pkwy., Brooklyn (Quarters of Engine 257, Tower Ladder 170) - Serves Canarsie, Brownsville, East Flatbush, Flatlands, and Bergen Beach.

Division 8 is under the shared command of both the Staten Island and Brooklyn Borough Commanders, as Division 8 responds to portions of Southern Brooklyn as well as Staten Island.

The headquarters of the Brooklyn Borough Commander is located in the 11th Division, 31st Battalion at 172 Tillary St., Brooklyn (Quarters of Engine 207, Ladder 110, Battalion 31, Division 11).

The following companies and units are under the Brooklyn Borough Command, quartered in 65 Firehouses:

(*) Denotes a Decon. Engine Company 
(**) Denotes an SOC Support Ladder Company.
(***) Denotes a Chemical Protective Clothing (CPC) Ladder Company.

Queens Borough Command
Below are a list of 2 Divisions under the Queens Borough Command:
13th Division - 91-45 121st St., Queens (Quarters of Squad 270) - Serves Southern Queens
Battalion 47 - 303 Beach 49th St., Queens (Quarters of Engine 265, Tower Ladder 121) - Serves the Rockaway Peninsula.
Battalion 50 - 153-11 Hillside Ave., Queens (Quarters of Engine 298, Tower Ladder 127) - Serves Jamaica, South Jamaica, Forest Hills, Hillcrest, Kew Gardens, and Richmond Hill.
Battalion 51 - 107-12 Lefferts Blvd., Queens (Quarters of Engine 308) - Serves Glendale, Howard Beach, Ozone Park, Richmond Hill, and Woodhaven.
Battalion 54 - 117-11 196th St., Queens (Quarters of Engine 317, Ladder 165) - Serves St. Alban's, Hollis, Rosedale, and South Jamaica.
14th Division - 108-01 Horace Harding Expressway, Queens (Quarters of Engine 324) - Serves Northern Queens
Battalion 45 - 33-51 Greenpoint Ave., Queens (Quarters of Engine 259, Ladder 128) - Serves Long Island City, Astoria, and Ridgewood.
Battalion 46 - 86-53 Grand Ave., Queens (Quarters of Engine 287, Ladder 136) - Serves Elmhurst, Corona, Woodside, Maspeth, and Middle Village.
Battalion 49 - 22-63 35th St., Queens (Quarters of Engine 312) - Serves Astoria, East Elmhurst, Jackson Heights, and Woodside.
Battalion 52 - 41-20 Murray St., Queens (Quarters of Engine 274) - Serves Flushing, Whitestone, College Point, and Utopia.
Battalion 53 - 64-04 Springfield Blvd., Queens (Quarters of Engine 326, Tower Ladder 160) - Serves Bayside, Douglaston, Glen Oaks, Queens Village, Auburndale, and Oakland Gardens.

The headquarters of the Queens Borough Commander is located in Fort Totten Bldg.420A in Bayside.

The following companies and units are under the Queens Borough Command, quartered in 51 Firehouses:

(*) Denotes a Decon. Engine Company.
(**) Denotes a SOC Support Ladder Company.
(***) Denotes a Chemical Protective Clothing (CPC) Ladder Company.

Special Operations Command
The Special Operations Command (SOC) Division commands the New York City Fire Department's Special Operations Units, and is divided into 3 Battalions: the Special Operations Battalion (also known as the Rescue Battalion), the Haz-Mat.Ops Battalion (Haz-Mat. Operations Battalion), and the Marine Battalion. The Special Operations Command Division is located at 750 Main St. on Roosevelt Island. Located at the SOC Division are numerous special, support, reserve, and spare units/apparatus used by the FDNY.

Special Operations/Rescue Battalion
The Special Operations Battalion, also known as the Rescue Battalion, oversees the operations of all of the FDNY's Special Units, many of which are located at the SOC Division, while others are quartered at firehouses throughout the city, such as the Collapse Rescue Units. The Special Operations/Rescue Battalion also oversees the operations of all of the FDNY's Rescue and Squad Companies.

Hazardous Materials (Haz-Mat.) Battalion
The Hazardous Materials (Haz-Mat.) Battalion oversees the operations of all of the FDNY's Haz-Mat. operations, the Haz-Mat. Company, as well as many other Haz-Mat. Units located at the SOC Division on Roosevelt Island.

Marine Battalion
The following are the locations of the various fireboats operated by the New York City Fire Department under the Marine Battalion. There are also several smaller Marine Operations Fire and Rescue Boats operated by the Marine Battalion: Marine Operations 1, 2, 3, 4, and 8. Marine Companies 3,4,and 8 are Seasonal units.

Other FDNY Facilities
The Fire Academy, the Bureau of Training, and the Mand Department Library are located on Randall's Island, along with the Haz-Mat Battalion and the Mask Service Unit.

The Special Operations Command Division is located at 750 Main St. on Roosevelt Island in the East River.

The Fleet Maintenance Division, also known as "The Shops" is located at 48-38 35th St., Long Island City.

The Building Maintenance Division is located at 48-34 35th St., Long Island City.

The Research and Development Division and the Quartermaster's Office are located at Fort Totten, Queens.

The Fire Museum is located at 278 Spring St., Manhattan.

The FDNY Fire Zone is located at 34 W. 51st St., Manhattan.

Bureau of Fire Investigation
The BFI's Special Service Unit and Photo Unit are located at 26 Hooper St., Brooklyn.

The BFI's Special Investigations Unit and Manhattan Base are located at 251 Lafayette St., Manhattan.

The BFI's Bronx Base is located at 453 E. 176th St., Bronx.

The BFI's Brooklyn Base is located at 5600 1st Ave., Brooklyn.

The BFI's Queens Base is located at Fort Totten, Queens.

The BFI's Joint Arson Task Force is located at 97-45 Queens Blvd., Queens.

Communications Offices
As of 2018, the Brooklyn, and Staten Island Communications Offices are located at Public Safety Answering Center 1 (PSAC 1), 11 Metrotech Center, Brooklyn.  The Brooklyn Communications Office was formerly located at 35 Empire Blvd., Brooklyn. The Staten Island Communications Office was formerly located at 65 Slosson Rd., Staten Island.

The Bronx, Manhattan/Citywide, and Queens Communications Offices are located at Public Safety Answering Center 2 (PSAC 2), 350 Marconi St., Bronx. The Bronx Communications Office was formerly located at 1129 E. 180th St., Bronx. The Manhattan Communications Office was formerly located at E. 79th St. and Transverse Rd., Central Park, Manhattan. The Queens Communications Office was formerly located at 83-98 Woodhaven Blvd., Queens.

Bureau of Fire Prevention

The BFP's HQ and the following specialty units are located at 9 MetroTech Center, Brooklyn. 
Administration/Planning/HR
Code Development and Implementation 
Customer Service Center
Emergency Planning & Preparedness
Explosives Control/Firework Safety
Fire Alarm Inspections
Fire Suppression and Construction Demolition Safety
Hazard Control (Bulk Fuel Safety/Laboratory Inspections) 
High Rise Inspections and Special Task Forces
Public Certifications & Education
Public Buildings Safety Inspections
Rangehood Inspections
Technology Management/Plan Review

The District Offices HQ is located at 1 Pierrepont Plaza, Brooklyn.
DO1 
DO3
DO6
DO7
DO8
DO11
DO12
DO13
DO14
DO15

The Hazardous Cargo Vehicle Inspection Unit (Hazard Control) is located at 245 Meserole Avenue, Brooklyn.

The BFP Training Unit is located at Ft. Totten, Queens. Classes are held at the Fire Academy and Ft. Totten.

FDNY EMS

There are currently 9 Divisions within the FDNY's EMS Command, which in turn command a total of 37 EMS Stations located throughout the five boroughs of the city. Former NYC EMS Station numbers are in Parenthesis.

Division 1 (Manhattan South)
EMS Division 1 serves Manhattan south of 59 St.
EMS Station 04 (11) (Lower East Side Station) - 271 Marginal St., Pier 36
EMS Station 07 (Midtown West Station) - 512 W. 23rd St
EMS Station 08 (13) (Kips Bay Station) - 435 E. 26 St. (Bellevue Hosp. Ctr.)

Division 2 (Bronx South)
EMS Division 2 serves the southern part of The Bronx, roughly south of Fordham Rd and west of the Bronx River.
EMS Station 14 (21) (South Bronx Station) - 234 E. 149th St. (Lincoln Med. & Mental Health Ctr.)
EMS Station 17 (Highbridge Station [Ogden Outpost]) - 1080 Ogden Ave. (Former quarters FDNY Engine 68, Ladder 49)
EMS Station 18 (Bathgate Station) - 1647 Washington Ave. (Next to current quarters of Rescue 3)
EMS Station 82 (Bronx Tactical Response Group - BTRG) - 1647 Washington Ave. (Next to current quarters of Rescue 3)
EMS Station 26 (22) (Morrisania Station) - 1264 Boston Rd. (Former quarters of FDNY Engine 85, Ladder 59)
EMS Station 55 (Melrose Station) - 3134 Park Ave. (Former quarters FDNY Engine 71, Ladder 55)

Division 3 (Brooklyn Central)
EMS Division 3 serves Central Brooklyn.
EMS Station 38 (Wingate Station) - 554 Winthrop St. (Kings County Hosp. Ctr.)
EMS Station 39 (34) (Pennsylvania Station) - 265 Pennsylvania Ave.
EMS Station 44 (Brownsville Station) - 266 Rockaway Ave.
EMS Station 58 (33) (Canarsie Station) - 420 E. 83rd St. 
EMS Station 59 (Spring Creek Station) - 101-10 Foster Av.

Division 4 (Queens East)
EMS Division 4 serves Eastern Queens, east of the Van Wyck Expressway, including Howard Beach South of the Belt Parkway.
EMS Station 47 (Rockaway Station) - 303 Beach 49th St.
EMS Station 50 (Hillcrest Station) - 159-10 Goethals Ave.
EMS Station 50A (Original NYC EMS 45) (Queens Tactical Response Groupe - QTRG) - 82-68 164 St.
EMS Station 53 (Fort Totten Outpost) - Fort Totten Bldg. #103
EMS Station 54 (Springfield Gardens Station) - 222-15 Merrick Blvd.

Division 5 (Southern Brooklyn & Staten Island)
EMS Division 5 serves Southern Brooklyn and Staten Island.
EMS Station 22 (52) (Willowbrook Station) - 460 Brielle Ave. (Seaview Hosp. Rehabilitation Ctr. and Home) (In Staten Island)
EMS Station 23 (Rossville Station) - 1100 Rossville Ave. (In Staten Island)
EMS Station 40 (Sunset Park Station) - 5011 7th Ave. (Former quarters FDNY Engine 278) (In Brooklyn)
EMS Station 43 (31) (Gravesend Station) - 2601 Ocean Pkwy. (In Brooklyn) (Coney Island Hosp.)

Division 6 (Manhattan North)
EMS Division 1 serves Manhattan north of 59 St.
EMS Station 10 (15) (Yorkville Station) - 1918 1st Ave. (Metropolitan Hosp. Ctr.)
EMS Station 13 (Washington Heights Station) - 501 W. 172nd St
EMS Station 16 (18) (Harlem Station)- 15 W. 136th St. (Harlem Hosp. Ctr.)

Division 7 (Bronx North)
EMS Division 7 serves the northern and eastern parts of The Bronx, roughly north of Fordham Rd and west of the Bronx River.
EMS Station 03 (Soundview Station) - 501 Zerega Ave.
EMS Station 15 (Williamsbridge Station)- 4109 White Plains Rd. (Former quarters of FDNY Engine 63)
EMS Station 19 (University Heights) - 2285 Jerome Ave. (Former quarters FDNY Engine 75, Tower Ladder 33, Battalion 19)
EMS Station 20 (23) (Morris Park Station) - 1410 Pelham Pkwy. S. (Jacobi Med. Ctr. (Bronx Municipal Hosp. Ctr.))
EMS Station 27 (Woodlawn Station) - 243 E. 233rd St. (Former quarters FDNY Ladder 39)

Division 8 (Brooklyn North)
EMS Division 8 serves Northern Brooklyn.
EMS Station 31 (36) (Cumberland Station) - 39 Auburn Pl. (Cumberland Diagnostic & Treatment Ctr. [Formerly Cumberland Hosp.])
EMS Station 32 (Carroll Gardens Station) - 347 Bond St.
EMS Station 35 (37 - When formerly located on grounds of Woodhull Med. & Mental Health Ctr.) (Williamsburg Station) - 332 Metropolitan Ave.
EMS Station 57 (Bedford-Stuyvesant Station) - 131 Throop Ave. (Woodhull Med. & Mental Health Ctr.)

Division 9 (Queens West)
EMS Division 9 serves Eastern Queens, west of the Van Wyck Expressway.
EMS Station 45 (Second quarters of NYC EMS 46. Also has Telemetry Control on site) (Woodside Station) - 58-65 52nd Rd.
EMS Station 46 (Original NYC EMS 46) (Elmhurst Station) - 79-01 Broadway (Elmhurst Hosp. Ctr.)
EMS Station 49 (Astoria Station) - 26th St & Hoyt Ave N. (Under Robert F. Kennedy Bridge)
EMS Station 49A (Rikers Island Outpost) - 14-16 Hazen St
EMS Station 52 (Flushing Outpost) - 135-16 38th Ave.

Volunteer Fire Departments/Companies in New York City
There are nine volunteer fire departments in New York City that respond to calls in their neighborhood in addition to a normal assignment of FDNY units.

The nine volunteer fire departments are a supplement to the FDNY, however they have proven essential at particular incidents and during certain times. Such as during storms when flooding conditions prevented FDNY Companies from reaching alarms or with a delayed response. They are located in the more isolated neighborhoods of the city, which have geographical issues such as limited access, tight streets or large areas of brush, etc. Many of the members are also New York City employees including the FDNY, EMS and NYPD and/or reside in the response area of their department which benefits their service.

Typically the departments respond in addition to the initial assignment dispatched by the FDNY. The volunteer departments are fully trained and operational with the apparatus and equipment they have. Therefore, when they arrive to a scene first or when needed they will implement their operations alongside FDNY as applicable.

There is at least one volunteer fire department in every borough of the city except Manhattan.

Four of the volunteer companies in Queens and the one in Brooklyn also provide emergency medical/ambulance services.

The following is a list of all volunteer fire departments in the city of New York according to borough.

Bronx
Edgewater Park Volunteer Hose Company No. 1 - Main St. and Adee Dr.
Engine Company 1
Engine Company 3

Brooklyn
Gerrittsen Beach Volunteer Fire Department - 52 Seba Ave.
Engine Company 1
Ambulance Unit
Brush Fire Unit
Utility Truck
Marine Unit
Chiefs Truck

Queens
Broad Channel and West Hamilton Beach have teleprinters in parallel with the FDNY fire companies that also serve their area. They operate on their own frequency but communicate with FDNY via the Queens Dispatch Frequency. 
West Hamilton Beach Volunteer Fire Department - 102-33 Davenport Ct.
Engine Company 944
Engine Company 946
Ambulance 947
Ambulance 947-1
Ambulance 947-2
BFU 1
Chief 941
Deputy Chief 942
Broad Channel Volunteer Fire Department - 15 Noel Rd.
Engine Company 2
Engine Company 210
Ambulance 309
Ambulance 312
Marine 1
Chief 101
Chief 102
Roxbury Volunteer Fire Department - 42 State Rd.
Engine 211 (Brush Unit)
Engine 212
Ambulance Unit
Rockaway Point Volunteer Fire Department - 204-26 Rockaway Point Blvd.
Engine Company 1
Rescue Company 1
Rescue Company 2
Point Breeze Volunteer Fire Department - 29 Point Breeze Ave.
Engine Company 7
Ladder Company 8

Staten Island
The Staten Island volunteer companies are dispatched by the Staten Island Communications Office and operate on their own frequency but communicate with FDNY via the Staten Island Dispatch frequency. 
Oceanic Volunteer Hook & Ladder Company No. 1 - 4010 Victory Blvd.
Engine 1
Brush 2
Richmond Volunteer Engine Company No. 1 - 3664 Richmond Rd.
Engine 1
Metropolitan Fire Assoc. - 460 Brielle Ave.
Engine 62
TRV 12

Disbanded Fire Companies
Throughout the history of the New York City Fire Department, there have been many fire companies disbanded due to budgetary cutbacks or departmental reorganization. Below is a list of disbanded fire companies organized by borough. There are several Tactical Control Units and Fireboats that were assigned to different Companies

Manhattan
Engine 2 - 530 W. 43rd St., Manhattan - Disbanded Nov. 25, 1972 - Current quarters of Rescue 1
Engine 11 - 437 E. Houston St., Manhattan - Disbanded Oct. 15, 1957 to form Engine 91-1
Engine 12 - 261 William St., Manhattan - Disbanded Oct. 1, 1959
Engine 13 - 253 Lafayette St., Manhattan (Quarters of Ladder 20) - Disbanded Dec. 16, 1974
Engine 17 - 25 Pitt St., Manhattan (Quarters of Ladder 18, Battalion 4) - Disbanded Jan. 3, 1991
Engine 18 - 132 W. 10th St., Manhattan - Disbanded Jul. 1, 1998 to organize Squad 18
Engine 19 - 355 W. 25th St., Manhattan - Disbanded Jan. 1, 1947
Engine 20 - 243 Lafayette St., Manhattan - Disbanded Jan. 1, 1947
Engine 25 - 342 E. 5th St., Manhattan - Disbanded Jan. 1, 1947
Engine 27 - 173 Franklin St., Manhattan - Disbanded Nov. 22, 1975
Engine 29 - 160 Chambers St., Manhattan - Disbanded Jan. 1, 1947
Engine 30 - 278 Spring St., Manhattan - Disbanded Apr. 1, 1959 - Currently the Fire Museum
Engine 31 - 87 Lafayette St., Manhattan - Disbanded Nov. 25, 1972
Engine 32 - 49 Beekman St., Manhattan (Quarters of Engine 6) - Disbanded Nov. 25, 1972
Engine 36 - 120 E. 125th St., Manhattan - Disbanded May 25, 2003
Engine 49 - Welfare Island, Manhattan - Disbanded Sept. 21, 1958
Engine 56 - 120 W. 83rd St., Manhattan - Disbanded May 1, 1960
Engine 57(Fireboat) - Pier 1, North River, Manhattan - Disbanded Jun. 1, 1959 to organize Marine 1
Engine 77(Fireboat) - Foot of Fulton St., East River, Manhattan - Disbanded Jun. 1, 1959 to organize Marine 7
Engine 78(Fireboat) - Foot of E. 90th St., Harlem River, Manhattan - Disbanded Jun. 1, 1959 to organize Marine 5
Engine 86(Fireboat) - Foot of Bloomfield St., North River, Manhattan - Disbanded Jun. 1, 1959 to organize Marine 2
Engine 87(Fireboat) - Foot of Grand St., East River, Manhattan - Disbanded Oct. 21, 1954
Engine 91-2 - 242 E. 111th St., Manhattan - Disbanded Dec. 16, 1974
Ladder 26-2 - 1367 5th Ave., Manhattan - Disbanded Dec. 16, 1974
High Ladder 1(146' Aerial Ladder) - 238 E. 40th St., Manhattan - Disbanded Apr. 22, 1966
Rescue 6 - 253 Lafayette St., Manhattan (Quarters of Ladder 20, Division 1) - Organized Temporarily Aug. 3, 2004 - Disbanded Nov. 3, 2004
Squad 6 - 120 W. 83rd St., Manhattan - Disbanded Nov. 24, 1972 to organize Ladder 59
Squad 8 - 87 Lafayette St., Manhattan - Disbanded Apr. 22, 1966 - Reactivated Dec 10, 2018 on Staten Island
Squad 9 - 159 E. 85th St., Manhattan (Quarters of Engine 22) - Disbanded Jul. 1, 1967 to organize Engine 85
Battalion 5 - 42 Great Jones St., Manhattan (Quarters of Engine 33, Ladder 9) - Disbanded Dec. 16, 1974
Battalion 24 - 248 W. 143rd St., Manhattan - Disbanded May 1, 1909
Battalion 25 - 242 E. 111th St., Manhattan (Quarters of Engine 91) - Disbanded Nov. 29, 1989
Division 2 - 205 W. 77th St., Manhattan (Quarters of Ladder 25) - Disbanded Jan. 25, 1997
Salvage 2 - 242 E. 111th St., Manhattan - Disbanded Feb. 9, 1991

Bronx
Engine 41 - 330 E. 150th St., Bronx - Disbanded July 1, 1998 to organize Squad 41
Engine 41-2 - 330 E. 150th St., Bronx - Disbanded Jan. 17, 1974
Engine 46-2 - 451 E. 176th St., Bronx - Disbanded Oct. 15, 1969 to organize Engine 88-2
Engine 50-2 - 491 E. 166th St., Bronx - Disbanded Mar. 23, 1974
Engine 61 - 1518 Williamsbridge Rd., Bronx - Disbanded July 1, 1998 to organize Squad 61
Engine 70-2 - 169 Schofield St., Bronx - Disbanded Sept. 12, 1971
Engine 85 - 1264 Boston Rd., Bronx - Disbanded May 20, 1986 to reorganize Ladder 53 - Current quarters of FDNY EMS Station 26
Engine 88-2 - 2225 Belmont Ave., Bronx - Disbanded Nov. 22, 1972 to reorganize Engine 72
Engine 512(Tactical Control Unit) - 925 E. Tremont Ave., Bronx - Disbanded Nov. 27, 1971
Engine 513(Tactical Control Unit) - 1226 Seneca Ave., Bronx - Disbanded Nov. 27, 1971
Ladder 17-2 - 341 E. 143rd St., Bronx - Disbanded Dec. 16, 1974
Ladder 27-2 - 453 E. 176th St., Bronx - Disbanded Nov. 6, 1972 to organize Ladder 58
Ladder 712(Tactical Control Unit) - 1264 Boston Rd., Bronx - Disbanded Nov. 24, 1972 to organize Ladder 59
Squad 2 - 659 Prospect St., Bronx (Quarters of Engine 73, Ladder 42) - Disbanded May 1, 1976
Squad 5 - 330 E. 150th St., Bronx (Quarters of Engine 41) - Disbanded May 1, 1976
Battalion 55 - 655 Prospect Ave., Bronx (Quarters of Engine 73, Ladder 42) - Disbanded Jul. 19, 1988
Battalion 56 - 460 Cross Bronx Expy., Bronx (Quarters of Engine 46, Ladder 27) - Disbanded Nov. 29, 1989
Division 4 - 2417 Webster Ave., Bronx (Quarters of Engine 48, Ladder 56) - Disbanded Jan. 25, 1997
Division 9 - 1841 White Plains Rd., Bronx (Quarters of Engine 90, Ladder 41) - Disbanded May 4, 1989
Salvage 3 - 2504 Webster Ave., Bronx - Disbanded Jan. 26, 1991
Salvage 5 - 1080 Ogden Ave., Bronx - Disbanded Jul. 1, 1982

Brooklyn
Engine 203 - 533 Hicks St., Brooklyn - Disbanded Dec. 16, 1974
Engine 204 - 299 DeGraw St., Brooklyn - Disbanded May 25, 2003
Engine 208 - 227 Front St., Brooklyn - Disbanded Nov. 22, 1972 to form Engine 167
Engine 209 - 850 Bedford St., Brooklyn (Quarters of Ladder 102) - Disbanded May 25, 2003
Engine 212 - 136 Wythe Ave., Brooklyn - Disbanded May 25, 2003
Engine 213 - 137 Powers St., Brooklyn - Disbanded Dec. 1, 1959
Engine 215 - 88 India St., Brooklyn - Disbanded Nov. 25, 1972
Engine 217-2 - 940 Dekalb Ave., Brooklyn - Disbanded Nov. 25, 1972
Engine 223(Fireboat) - Foot of 37th St., New York Bay, Brooklyn - Disbanded Jun. 1, 1959 to organize Marine 8
Engine 225-2 - 657 Liberty Ave., Brooklyn - Disbanded Nov. 29, 1969 to form Engine 531 (Tactical Control Unit)
Engine 232 - 266 Rockaway Ave., Brooklyn - Disbanded Jan. 24, 1988 - Current quarters of FDNY EMS Station 44
Engine 233-2 - 243 Hull St., Brooklyn - Disbanded Nov. 24, 1972 to organize Ladder 176
Engine 244 - 2929 W. 15th St., Brooklyn - Disbanded Jul. 23, 1968
Engine 252 - 617 Central Ave., Brooklyn - Disbanded Jul. 1, 1998 to organize Squad 252
Engine 256 - 124 Dekalb Ave., Brooklyn - Disbanded Dec. 17, 1974
Engine 269 - 786 Union St., Brooklyn - Disbanded Nov. 25, 1975
Engine 278 - 5011 7th Ave., Brooklyn - Disbanded May 25, 2003 (Now EMS Station 40)
Engine 327 - 2731 E. 23rd St., Brooklyn - Disbanded Jul. 16, 1960
Engine 531(Tactical Control Unit) - 657 Liberty Ave., Brooklyn - Disbanded Feb. 19, 1972
Ladder 103-2 - 480 Sheffield Ave., Brooklyn - Disbanded Dec. 16, 1974
Ladder 193 - 480 Sheffield Ave., Brooklyn (Quarters of Engine 290, Ladder 103) - Disbanded Aug. 10, 1968
Ladder 731(Tactical Control Unit) - 850 Bedford Ave., Brooklyn - Disbanded Nov. 27, 1971
Ladder 732(Tactical Control Unit) - 266 Rockaway Ave., Brooklyn - Disbanded Aug. 5, 1972 to organize Ladder 176
Squad 3 - 701 Park Ave., Brooklyn (Quarters of Engine 230) - Disbanded May 1, 1976
Squad 4 - 885 Howard Ave., Brooklyn (Quarters of Engine 283) - Disbanded May 1, 1976
Squad 7 - 43 Morgan Ave., Brooklyn (Quarters of Engine 237) - Disbanded Jul. 8, 1966 to reorganize Engine 232
Battalion 29 - 799 Lincoln Ave., Brooklyn - Disbanded Jul. 1, 1975
Battalion 30 - 436 39th St., Brooklyn - Disbanded Apr. 15, 1906 to organize Battalion 40
Battalion 34 - 850 Bedford Ave., Brooklyn - Disbanded Nov. 29, 1989
Battalion 60 - 650 Hart St., Brooklyn - Disbanded Jul. 1, 1975
Safety Battalion 2 - 165 Bradford Ave., Brooklyn (Quarters of Engine 332) - Disbanded Sep. 8, 1998
Division 10 - 395 4th Ave., Brooklyn (Quarters of Engine 239) - Disbanded Jul. 1, 1990 to reorganize Division 8
Division 12 - 2318 65th St., Brooklyn (Quarters of Engine 330) - Disbanded Mar. 21, 1995
Division 17 - 617 Central Ave., Brooklyn (Quarters of Engine 252) - Disbanded Jul. 1, 1975
Super Pumper 1 - 172 Tillary St., Brooklyn - Disbanded April 24(?), 1982
Super Tender 1 - 172 Tillary St., Brooklyn - Disbanded Jul. 1, 1975
Salvage 1 - 657 Liberty Ave., Brooklyn - Disbanded Dec. 2, 1986
Salvage 4 - 648 Pacific St. - Disbanded Jan. 26, 1991

Queens
Engine 261 - 37-20 29th St., Queens - Disbanded May. 28, 2003
Engine 267 - 92-22 Rockaway Beach Blvd., Queens - Disbanded Nov. 25, 1972.
Engine 270 - 91-45 121st St., Queens - Disbanded Jul. 1, 1998 to organize Squad 270.
Engine 272 - 135-16 38th Ave., Queens - Disbanded Dec. 16, 1974.
Engine 288 - 91-45 121st St., Queens - Disbanded Jul. 1, 1998 to organize Squad 288.
Engine 296 - 18-18 125th St., Queens - Disbanded Apr. 1, 1961.
Engine 333 - Horace Harding Blvd. (1939 New York World's Fair), Queens - Disbanded Mar. 31, 1941.
Ladder 171 - 402 Beach 169th St., Queens - Disbanded Nov. 22, 1975.
High Ladder 2(146' Aerial Ladder) - 108-01 Horace Harding Expy., Queens - Disbanded Aug. 14, 1965.
Battalion 59 - 78-11 67th Rd., Queens - Disbanded Nov. 29, 1989
Division 5 - 108-01 Horace Harding Expy., Queens (Quarters of Engine 324) - Disbanded Jan. 25, 1997.
Division 16 - 41-20 Murray St., Queens (Quarters of Engine 274) - Disbanded Oct. 4, 1975.

Staten Island
Engine 51(Fireboat) - Pier 6, Hannah St., Staten Island - Disbanded Jun. 1, 1959 to organize Marine 9
Engine 154 - 3730 Victory Blvd., Staten Island - Disbanded Dec. 10, 2018 to organize Squad 8

See also
 New York City Fire Department
 Organization of the Chicago Fire Department
 Los Angeles Fire Department
 Los Angeles County Fire Department
 Orange County Fire Authority

References

External links 
 

New York City Fire Department